Red Eye Records may refer to:
 Red Eye Records (label), an independent record label started in 1985 
 Red Eye Records (store), an independent record store in Sydney, Australia

See also
 Redeye Distribution, an American record label